Burke Byrnes (born December 9, 1937) is an American actor, best known as the voice for Daddy Topps in The Land Before Time. He appeared in more than seventy films from 1969 to 1994.

Filmography

References

External links 

1937 births
Living people
American male film actors
Male actors from New York (state)
People from Oceanside, New York
American male voice actors